Pat (Pascel Emmanuel) LaBarbera (born April 7, 1944) is an American-born Canadian jazz tenor, alto and soprano saxophonist, clarinetist, and flautist born in Mt. Morris, New York, most notable for his work as a soloist in Buddy Rich bands from 1967 to 1973.

He moved to Toronto, Ontario in 1974, and is a member of the faculty at Humber College. La Barbera began working with Elvin Jones in 1975, touring Europe with him in 1979. While working with Buddy Rich, Pat also was working in groups led by Woody Herman and Louie Bellson. Pat has also played with Carlos Santana. LaBarbera has played a major role in the development of a generation of Canadian saxophonists. In 2000, he won a Juno Award for Best Traditional Instrumental Jazz Album for Deep in a Dream.

Pat is the brother of fellow musicians John LaBarbera (trumpet) and Joe LaBarbera (drums).

Discography

As a leader
 1975:  Pass It On (PM)
 1978:  The Wizard
 1979:  The Meeting
 1981:  Necessary Evil
 1987:  Virgo Dance
 1997: Standard Transmission (GOWI Records) with John Abercrombie, Jacek Kochan, Jim Vivian
 2001: From the Heart
 2002: Deep In A Dream
 2005: Crossing the Line
 2016: Silent Voices
 2018: Trane of Thought (with Kirk MacDonald)

As sideman
With Buddy Rich
 The New One 1967
 Mercy, Mercy 1968
 Buddy and Soul 1969
 Keep the Customer Satisfied 1970
 A Different Drummer 1971
 Stick It 1972
 Rich in London 1972
 Roar of '74 1973

With Elvin Jones
 The Main Force (Vanguard, 1976)
 Remembrance (MPS, 1978)
 Elvin Jones Music Machine (Mark Levison, 1978)
 Live in Japan 1978: Dear John C. (Trio (Japan), 1978)
 Elvin Jones Jazz Machine Live in Japan Vol. 2 (Trio (Japan), 1978)
 Brother John (Palo Alto, 1982)
 Live at the Village Vanguard Volume One (Landmark, 1984)
 Elvin Jones Jazz Machine Live at Pit Inn (Polydor (Japan), 1985)

With others
 Dave McMurdo Jazz Orchestra 1989 (Canada)
 Denny Christianson and Jan Jarczyk, Goin' Places 2000 (Canada)
 John LaBarbera Big Band, On the Wild Side 2003 (2004 Grammy Nominee)
 John LaBarbera Big Band, "Phantasm"  2005

References

Hard bop saxophonists
Hard bop clarinetists
Berklee College of Music alumni
Canadian jazz saxophonists
Male saxophonists
Canadian jazz clarinetists
American jazz saxophonists
American male saxophonists
American jazz clarinetists
1944 births
Living people
Juno Award for Traditional Jazz Album of the Year winners
21st-century American saxophonists
21st-century clarinetists
21st-century American male musicians
American male jazz musicians